The Global Marshall Plan is a plan first devised by former American Vice-President Al Gore in his bestselling book Earth in the Balance, which gives specific ideas on how to save the global environment.  

Gore states: "The model of the Marshall Plan can be of great help. For example, a Global Marshall Plan must focus on strategic goals and emphasize actions and programs that are likely to remove the bottlenecks presently inhibiting the healthy functioning of the global economy. The new global economy must be an inclusive system that does not leave entire regions behind. The new plan will require the wealthy nations to allocate money for transferring environmentally helpful technologies to the Third World and to help impoverished nations achieve a stable population and a new pattern of sustainable economic progress. To work, however, any such effort will also require wealthy nations to make a transition themselves that will be in some ways more wrenching than that of the Third World." 

Source: Earth in the Balance, page 297-301 

Global Marshall Plan: Five strategic goals 
"In my view, five strategic goals must direct and inform our efforts to save the global environment":

 stabilizing of world population
 the rapid development of environmentally appropriate technologies
 a comprehensive change in the economic "rules of the road" by which we measure the impact of our decisions on the environment
 negotiation & approval of a new generation of international agreements
 a cooperative plan for educating the world's citizens about our global environment.

The idea is based on the post-WWII Marshall Plan that saw the United States send billions of dollars to European nations to rebuild their war shattered economies.

In order to further the idea of a GMP and to coordinate the various initiatives, NGOs, scientists, activists and groups in the field of development cooperation and global social justice the Global Marshall Plan Initiative was founded by members of the Club of Rome, the Club of Budapest, the Eco-Social Forum Europe, ATTAC and other organisations in Frankfurt, Germany in 2003. The two main objectives are to find new ways and sources of financing in development cooperation, predominantly pursuing the Millennium Development Goals of the UN and the worldwide propagation of the eco-social market economy, which is considered to be one of today's key strategies of initiative.

See also
Global Marshall Plan Initiative

Literature
Franz Josef Radermacher: Global Marshall Plan. A Planetary Contract. Hamburg, 2004.

External links
Global Marshall Plan Initiative
Plant for the Planet Initiative
GMPI Regional Groups

References

Al Gore